Whistlefield may refer to one of the below two settlements in Scotland:

 Whistlefield, Argyll, hamlet on the Cowal peninsula, Argyll and Bute, Scotland
 Whistlefield, Dunbartonshire, location above Loch Long, Argyll and Bute, Scotland